Mauricio Pineda may refer to:
Mauricio Pineda (footballer, born 1975), Argentine defender
Mauricio Pineda (soccer, born 1997), American midfielder